Kliment Yefremovich Voroshilov (Klyment Okhrimovych Voroshylov), popularly known as Klim Voroshilov (Klim Vorošilov; 4 February 1881 – 2 December 1969), was a prominent Soviet military officer and politician during the Stalin era. He was one of the original five Marshals of the Soviet Union, the highest military rank of the Soviet Union, and served as Chairman of the Presidium of the Supreme Soviet, the nominal Soviet head of state, from 1953 to 1960.

Born to a Russian worker's family in modern Ukraine, Voroshilov took part in the Russian Revolution of 1917 as an early member of the Bolsheviks. He served with distinction at the Battle of Tsaritsyn, during which he became a close friend of Stalin. Voroshilov was elected to the Central Committee of the Communist Party in 1921, and in 1925 Stalin appointed him People's Commissar for Military and Navy Affairs (later People's Commissars for Defence). In 1926, he became a full member of the Politburo. In 1935, Voroshilov was named a Marshal of the Soviet Union. 

At the outbreak of World War II, Voroshilov was held responsible for Soviet failures in Finland during the Winter War and was replaced as Defense Commissar by Semyon Timoshenko. Following the German invasion in June 1941, he was recalled and appointed to the State Defense Committee. Voroshilov failed to stop the German encirclement of Leningrad and was again relieved from his command in September 1941.

After the war, Voroshilov oversaw the establishment of a socialist regime in Hungary. Following Stalin's death in 1953, Voroshilov was appointed Chairman of the Presidium of the Supreme Soviet. His fortunes declined during the rise of Nikita Khrushchev and the Supreme Soviet turned against him. He peacefully resigned in 1960, although he came out of retirement in 1966 and re-joined the party. Voroshilov died in 1969 at the age of 88.

Early life
 Voroshilov was born in the settlement of Verkhnyeye, Bakhmut uyezd, Yekaterinoslav Governorate, Russian Empire (now part of Lysychansk city in Luhansk Oblast, Ukraine), into a railway worker's family of Russian ethnicity. According to the Soviet Major General Petro Grigorenko, Voroshilov himself alluded to the heritage of his birth-country (Ukraine) and to the previous family name of Voroshylo. During his school years, Voroshilov became a close friend and almost a member of the family of Semyon Ryzhkov, who later became the second secretary of the First Duma.

Russian Revolution
Voroshilov joined the Bolshevik faction of the Russian Social Democratic Labour Party in 1903. Following the Russian Revolution of 1917, Voroshilov became a member of the Ukrainian Council of People's Commissars and Commissar for Internal Affairs along with Vasiliy Averin. He was well known for aiding Joseph Stalin in the Revolutionary Military Council, having become closely associated with Stalin during the Red Army's 1918 defense of Tsaritsyn, and one of the Cavalry Army clique.

Voroshilov was active as a commander of the Southern Front during the Russian Civil War and the Polish–Soviet War while with the 1st Cavalry Army. As Political Commissar serving co-equally with Stalin, Voroshilov was responsible for the morale of the 1st Cavalry Army, which was composed chiefly of peasants from southern Russia.

Voroshilov headed the Petrograd Police during 1917 and 1918.

Interwar period

Voroshilov served as a member of the Central Committee from his election in 1921 until 1961. In 1925, after the death of Mikhail Frunze, Voroshilov was appointed People's Commissar for Military and Navy Affairs and Chairman of the Revolutionary Military Council of the USSR, a post he held until 1934. His main accomplishment in this period was to move key Soviet war industries east of the Urals, so that the Soviet Union could strategically retreat, while keeping its manufacturing capability intact. Frunze's political position adhered to that of the Troika (Grigory Zinoviev, Lev Kamenev, Stalin), but Stalin preferred to have a close, personal ally in charge (as opposed to Frunze, a "Zinovievite"). Frunze was urged by a group of Stalin's hand-picked doctors to have surgery to treat an old stomach ulcer, despite previous doctors' recommendations to avoid surgery and Frunze's own unwillingness. He died on the operating table of a massive overdose of chloroform, an anaesthetic. Voroshilov became a full member of the newly formed Politburo in 1926, remaining a member until 1960.

Voroshilov was appointed People's Commissar (Minister) for Defence in 1934 and a Marshal of the Soviet Union in 1935. He played a central role in Stalin's Great Purge of the 1930s, denouncing many of his own military colleagues and subordinates when asked to do so by Stalin. He wrote personal letters to exiled former Soviet officers and diplomats such as commissar Mikhail Ostrovsky, asking them to return voluntarily to the Soviet Union and falsely reassuring them that they would not face retribution from authorities. Voroshilov personally signed 185 documented execution lists, fourth among the Soviet leadership after Molotov, Stalin and Kaganovich. Voroshilov did not personally share the paranoia towards upper-class elements of the officer corps. He openly declared that the saboteurs in the Red Army were few in number and tried to save the lives of officers like Lukin, who would serve with distinction during the Second World War, and Sokolov-Strakhov, and he was sometimes successful. He had no problem denouncing officers he disliked such as Tukhachevsky.

Despite taking part in the purging of many "mechanisers" (supporters of wide usage of tanks rather than cavalry) from the Red Army, Voroshilov became convinced that reliance on cavalry should be decreased while more modern arms should receive higher priority. Marshal Budyonny tried to recruit him to his cause of protecting the status of cavalry in the Red Army but Voroshilov openly declared his intention to do the opposite. He praised the army's combined arms warfare capabilities as well as the high quality and ability to take initiative of the officers during the 1936 summer manoeuvers. However he also pointed out issues in the Red Army as a whole in his full report. Among the issues he pointed out were insufficient communication, ineffective staffs, insufficient cooperation between arms, and the rudimentary nature of the command structure in tank units and other modern arms. 

When the Great Purge ended, some reforms were undertaken by the high command to reconcile Red Army doctrine (for example deep operations doctrine) with the real state of the Red Army. The politically appointed commanders of the post-purge Red Army saw that the army, especially after the purge, was not suitable to carry out deep operations style warfare. Commanders such as Voroshilov and Kulik were among the instigators of these reforms which positively impacted the Red Army. These commanders themselves turned out not to be able to carry out such operations in practice. Voroshilov and Kulik turned out to be unable to put these reforms into practice. One of these reforms was a reorganization of  Red Army field units which accidentally moved Red Army organization to a far less advanced state than it had been in 1936. This reorganization was conceived by Kulik but put into practice by Voroshilov.

When territorial units were abolished Voroshilov noted that among the reasons for disbanding them was inability to train conscripts in the use of modern technology. He had openly proclaimed that the system was inadequate in an era in which imperialist powers (such as Germany) were expanding the capabilities of their armies. The territorial units had been very unpopular, not only with Voroshilov, but with the Red Army leadership a whole. They were hopelessly ineffective: territorial conscript Alexey Grigorovich Maslov noted that he never fired a shot during his training, while it was noted that these units only underwent real training in the one month a year when experienced veterans returned.

World War II 
Voroshilov commanded Soviet troops during the Winter War from November 1939 to January 1940 but, due to poor Soviet planning and Voroshilov's incompetence as a general, the Red Army suffered about 320,000 casualties compared to 70,000 Finnish casualties. When the leadership gathered at Stalin's dacha at Kuntsevo, Stalin shouted at Voroshilov for the losses; Voroshilov replied in kind, blaming the failure on Stalin for eliminating the Red Army's best generals in his purges. Voroshilov followed this retort by smashing a platter of roast suckling pig on the table. Nikita Khrushchev said it was the only time he ever witnessed such an outburst. Voroshilov was nonetheless made the scapegoat for the initial failures in Finland. He was later replaced as Defense Commissar by Semyon Timoshenko. Voroshilov was then made Deputy Premier responsible for cultural matters.
Voroshilov initially argued that thousands of Polish army officers captured in September 1939 should be released, but he later signed the order for their execution in the Katyn massacre of 1940.

Between 1941 and 1944, Voroshilov was a member of the State Defense Committee.

After the German invasion of the Soviet Union in June 1941, Voroshilov became commander of the short-lived Northwestern Direction (July to August 1941), controlling several fronts. In September 1941 he commanded the Leningrad Front. Working alongside military commander Andrei Zhdanov as German advances threatened to cut off Leningrad, he displayed considerable personal bravery in defiance of heavy shelling at Ivanovskoye; at one point he rallied retreating troops and personally led a counter-attack against German tanks armed only with a pistol. However, the style of counterattack he launched had long since been abandoned by strategists and drew mostly contempt from his military colleagues; he failed to prevent the Germans from surrounding Leningrad and he was dismissed from his post and replaced by Georgy Zhukov on 8 September 1941. Stalin had a political need for popular wartime leaders, however, and Voroshilov remained as an important figurehead.

Post war

Hungary
Between 1945 and 1947, Voroshilov supervised the establishment of the socialist republic in postwar Hungary. He attributed the poor showing of the Hungarian Communist Party in the October 1945 Budapest municipal elections to the number of minorities in leadership positions, arguing that it was "detrimental to the party that its leaders are not of Hungarian origin".

1952–1953 Soviet leadership
In 1952, Voroshilov was appointed a member of the Presidium of the Communist Party of the Soviet Union.

Stalin's death on 5 March 1953 prompted major changes in the Soviet leadership. On 15 March 1953, Voroshilov was approved as Chairman of the Presidium of the Supreme Soviet (i.e., the head of state) with Nikita Khrushchev as First Secretary of the Communist Party and Georgy Malenkov as Premier of the Soviet Union. Voroshilov, Malenkov, and Khrushchev brought about the 26 June 1953 arrest of Lavrenty Beria after Stalin's death.

One of Voroshilov's responsibilities as chairman of the Presidium was to oversee the appeal review of Soviet death row inmates. Analysis by Jeffrey S. Hardy and Yana Skorobogatov describe his role thus: 

"Chairman Voroshilov presided over the meetings and clearly had the most influential voice, but split votes were not uncommon and Voroshilov was sometimes outvoted... Throughout his tenure as Presidium chair, he behaved like someone who believed that one should follow established procedure and not act too quickly in matters of life and death."

Hardy and Skorobogatov indicate that Voroshilov frequently exerted his influence on the committee toward leniency, especially in the case of those who expressed repentance in their appeal documents and those convicted of crimes of passion or under the influence of alcohol; he judged those convicted of political crimes or acts with financial motives more harshly. During his tenure, many individuals sentenced to death had their punishments commuted to prison terms of varying lengths. The authors of the study observe that his successor, Brezhnev, took a noticeably harder line in appeals cases.

However, the contrast between Voroshilov's relatively magnanimous attitude toward pardon cases in the 1950s with his well-documented participation in the deadly purges of the 1930s (as described above) was noted even at the time by Khrushchev, who asked him, "So when were you acting according to your conscience, then or now?"

Fall from grace
After Khrushchev removed most of the Stalinists like Molotov and Malenkov from the party, Voroshilov's career began to fade. On 7 May 1960, the Supreme Soviet of the Soviet Union granted Voroshilov's request for retirement and elected Leonid Brezhnev chairman of the Presidium of the Supreme Council (the head of state). The Central Committee also relieved him of duties as a member of the Party Presidium (as the Politburo had been called since 1952) on 16 July 1960. In October 1961, his political defeat was complete at the 22nd party congress when he was excluded from election to the Central Committee.Following Khrushchev's fall from power, Soviet leader Brezhnev brought Voroshilov out of retirement into a figurehead political post. Voroshilov was again re-elected to the Central Committee in 1966. Voroshilov was awarded a second medal of Hero of the Soviet Union 1968.

Death

During a winter night in 1969, Voroshilov started to feel unwell. His family proposed to call an ambulance immediately, but he adamantly refused. In the morning he put on his military uniform, and after calling a car, he went to the hospital himself, fully decorated. Voroshilov died on 2 December, at the age of 88, and was buried in the Kremlin Wall Necropolis, in one of the twelve individual tombs located between the Lenin Mausoleum and the Kremlin wall.

Personal life

Voroshilov was married to Ekaterina Voroshilova, born Golda Gorbman, a Ukrainian Jew from Mardarovka. She changed her name when she converted to Orthodox Christianity in order to be allowed to marry Voroshilov. They met while both exiled in Arkhangelsk, where Ekaterina was sent in 1906. While both serving on the Tsaritsyn Front in 1918, where Ekaterina was helping orphans, they adopted a four-year-old orphan boy who they named Petya. They also adopted the children of Mikhail Frunze following his death in 1925. During Stalin's rule, they lived in the Kremlin at the Horse Guards.

His personality as it was described by Molotov in 1974: "Voroshilov was nice, but only in certain times. He always stood for the political line of the party, because he was from a working class, a common man, very good orator. He was clean, yes. And he was personally devoted to Stalin. But his devotion was not very strong. However in this period he advocated Stalin very actively, supported him in everything, though not entirely sure in everything. It also affected their relationship. This is a very complex issue. This must be taken into account to understand why Stalin treated him critically and not invited him at all our conversations. At least at private ones. But he came by himself. Stalin frowned. Under Khrushchev, Voroshilov behaved badly."

Honours and awards

Soviet Union
The Kliment Voroshilov (KV) series of tanks, used in World War II, was named after him. Two towns were also named after him: Voroshilovgrad in Ukraine (now changed back to the historical Luhansk) and Voroshilov in the Soviet Far East (now renamed Ussuriysk after the Ussuri river), as well as the General Staff Academy in Moscow. Stavropol was called Voroshilovsk from 1935 to 1943.
 Hero of the Soviet Union, two times (No. 10840 - 3 February 1956 (in conjunction with his 75th birthday), No. 47 - 22 February 1968 (in conjunction with the 50th anniversary of the Armed Forces of the USSR))
 Hero of Socialist Labour (No. 10268 - 7 May 1960)
Order of Lenin, eight times (No. 880 – 23 February 1935, No. 3582 – 22 February 1938, No. 14851 – 3 February 1941, No. 26411 – 21 February 1945, No. 128065 – 3 February 1951, No. 313410 – 3 February 1956, No. 331807 – 3 February 1961, No. 340967 – 22 February 1968)
 Order of the Red Banner, six times (No. 47 – 26 June 1919, No. 629 - 2 April 1921, No. 27 - 3–2 December 1925, No. 5 - 4–22 February 1930, No. 1 - 5–3 November 1944, No. 1–24 June 1948)
 Order of Suvorov, 1st class (No. 125 – 22 February 1944)
 Order of the Red Banner of the Uzbek Soviet Socialist Republic (17 February 1930)
 Order of the Red Banner of the Tajik SSR (No. 148 – 14 January 1933)
 Order of the Red Banner ZSFSR (25 February 1933)
 Jubilee Medal "XX Years of the Workers' and Peasants' Red Army" (22 February 1938)
 Medal "For the Victory over Germany in the Great Patriotic War 1941–1945" (1945)
 Medal "For the Defence of Leningrad"
 Medal "For the Defence of Moscow"
 Medal "For the Defence of the Caucasus"
 Medal "In Commemoration of the 800th Anniversary of Moscow" (21 September 1947)
 Jubilee Medal "30 Years of the Soviet Army and Navy" (22 February 1948)
 Jubilee Medal "40 Years of the Armed Forces of the USSR" (17 February 1958)
 Jubilee Medal "50 Years of the Armed Forces of the USSR"
 Jubilee Medal "Twenty Years of Victory in the Great Patriotic War 1941–1945" (1965)
Honorary Revolutionary Weapon (1920, 1968)

Foreign awards

Mongolia
 Hero of the Mongolian People's Republic (29 May 1957)
 Order of Sukhbaatar, twice
 Order of the Red Banner
Order of the Polar Star

Finland
 Grand Cross of the Order of the White Rose of Finland

Turkey
 Honorary citizen of Izmir, November 1933; in Izmir a street was also named after him. In 1951, it was renamed "Plevne Bulvarı".

See also
 Bibliography of the Russian Revolution and Civil War
 Bibliography of Stalinism and the Soviet Union
 Bibliography of the Post Stalinist Soviet Union
 Stalin's Peasants: Resistance and Survival in the Russian Village after Collectivization
 Everyday Stalinism: Ordinary Life in Extraordinary Times: Soviet Russia in the 1930s
 Stalin: Waiting for Hitler, 1929-1941
 Voroshilov Sharpshooter
 "Stalin and Voroshilov in the Kremlin," a famous Soviet painting
 List of mayors of Luhansk

References

External links
 Collection of Soviet songs about Klim Voroshilov
 

 
 

 
 

1881 births
1969 deaths
People from Lysychansk
People from Bakhmutsky Uyezd
Russians in Ukraine
Russian Social Democratic Labour Party members
Old Bolsheviks
Politburo of the Central Committee of the Communist Party of the Soviet Union members
Politburo of the Central Committee of the Communist Party of Ukraine (Soviet Union) members
Heads of state of the Soviet Union
Soviet Ministers of Defence
Soviet interior ministers of Ukraine
Russian Constituent Assembly members
First convocation members of the Soviet of the Union
Second convocation members of the Soviet of the Union
Third convocation members of the Soviet of the Union
Fourth convocation members of the Soviet of the Union
Fifth convocation members of the Soviet of the Union
Sixth convocation members of the Soviet of the Union
Seventh convocation members of the Soviet of the Union
First convocation members of the Verkhovna Rada of the Ukrainian Soviet Socialist Republic
Second convocation members of the Verkhovna Rada of the Ukrainian Soviet Socialist Republic
Third convocation members of the Verkhovna Rada of the Ukrainian Soviet Socialist Republic
Fourth convocation members of the Verkhovna Rada of the Ukrainian Soviet Socialist Republic
Anti-revisionists
Marshals of the Soviet Union
Soviet military personnel of the Russian Civil War
Soviet people of World War II
Russian people of World War II
Great Purge perpetrators
Commissioners of the Leningrad Police
Heroes of the Soviet Union
Heroes of Socialist Labour
Recipients of the Order of Lenin
Recipients of the Order of the Red Banner
Recipients of the Order of Suvorov, 1st class
Burials at the Kremlin Wall Necropolis